A photon rocket is a rocket that uses thrust from the momentum of emitted photons (radiation pressure by emission) for its propulsion. Photon rockets have been discussed as a propulsion system that could make interstellar flight possible, which requires the ability to propel spacecraft to speeds at least 10% of the speed of light, v ≈ 0.1c = 30,000 km/s. Photon propulsion has been considered to be one of the best available interstellar propulsion concepts, because it is founded on established physics and technologies. Traditional photon rockets are proposed to be powered by onboard generators, as in the nuclear photonic rocket. The standard textbook case of such a rocket is the ideal case where all of the fuel is converted to photons which are radiated in the same direction. In more realistic treatments, one takes into account that the beam of photons is not perfectly collimated, that not all of the fuel is converted to photons, and so on. A large amount of fuel would be required and the rocket would be a huge vessel.

The limitations posed by the rocket equation can be overcome, as long as the reaction mass is not carried by the spacecraft. In the Beamed Laser Propulsion (BLP), the photon generators and the spacecraft are physically separated and the photons are beamed from the photon source to the spacecraft using lasers.  However, BLP is limited because of the extremely low thrust generation efficiency of photon reflection.  One of the best ways to overcome the inherent inefficiency in producing thrust of the photon thruster is by amplifying the momentum transfer of photons by recycling photons between two high reflectance mirrors, one being stationary, or on a thruster, the other being the "sail".

Speed
The speed an ideal photon rocket will reach (in the reference frame in which the rocket was at rest initially), in the absence of external forces, depends on the ratio of its initial and final mass:

If the fusion products are released into space, the speed will be higher, but the above equation can't be used to compute it, because it assumes that all decrease in mass is converted into energy.

The gamma factor corresponding to a photon rocket speed has the simple expression:

At 10% the speed of light, the gamma factor is about 1.005, implying is very nearly 0.9.

Derivation

Conservation of four-momentum implies:

squaring both sides (i.e. taking the Lorentz inner product of both sides with themselves) gives:

According to the energy-momentum relation , the square of the four-momentum equals the square of the mass, and  because photons have zero mass.

As we start in the rest frame (i.e. the zero-momentum frame) of the rocket, the initial four-momentum of the rocket is:

while the final four-momentum is:

Therefore, taking the Minkowski inner product (see four-vector), we get:

We can now solve for the gamma factor, obtaining:

Maximum speed limit

Standard theory says that the theoretical speed limit of a photon rocket is below the speed of light. Haug has recently suggested a maximum speed limit for an ideal photon rocket that is just below the speed of light. However, his claims have been contested by Tommasini et al., because such velocity is formulated for the relativistic mass and is therefore frame-dependent.

Regardless of the photon generator characteristics, onboard photon rockets powered with nuclear fission and fusion have speed limits from the efficiency of these processes. Here it is assumed that the propulsion system has a single stage. Suppose the total mass of the photon rocket/spacecraft is M that includes fuels with a mass of αM with α < 1.  Assuming the fuel mass to propulsion-system energy conversion efficiency γ and the propulsion-system energy to photon energy conversion efficiency δ ≪ 1, the maximum total photon energy generated for propulsion, Ep, is given by

If the total photon flux can be directed at 100% efficiency to generate thrust, the total photon thrust, Tp, is given by

The maximum attainable spacecraft velocity, Vmax, of the photon propulsion system for Vmax ≪ c, is given by

For example, the approximate maximum velocities achievable by onboard nuclear powered photon rockets with assumed parameters are given in Table 1. The maximum velocity limits by such nuclear powered rockets are less than 0.02% of the light velocity (60 km/s).  Therefore, onboard nuclear photon rockets are unsuitable for interstellar missions.

Table 1  The maximum velocity obtainable by photon rockets with onboard nuclear photon generators with exemplary parameters.

The Beamed Laser Propulsion, such as Photonic Laser Thruster, however, can provide the maximum spacecraft velocity approaching the speed of light, c, in principle.

See also
 Beam-powered propulsion
 Laser propulsion
 Nuclear photonic rocket

Notes

References

External links
 Whatever happened to Photon Rockets?

Rocket propulsion